A baby shower is a party of gift-giving to celebrate the delivery or expected birth of a child or the transformation of a woman into a mother.

Etymology
The term shower is often assumed to mean that the expectant mother is "showered" with gifts. A related custom, called a bridal shower, may have derived its name from the custom in the 19th century for the presents to be put inside a parasol, which when opened would "shower" the bride-to-be with gifts. Alternatively the term possibly denotes a "first showing" of the new baby to the wider family and circle of friends, although the baby shower is usually held before the birth of the baby.

Description

Traditionally, baby showers are given only for the family's first child, and only women are invited, though this has changed in recent years, now allowing showers being split up for different audiences: workplace, mixed-sex, etc. Activities at baby showers include gift-giving and playing themed games.

Baby shower games vary, sometimes including standard games such as bingo, and sometimes being pregnancy-themed, such as "guess the mother's measurements" or "guess the baby". These games help the close friends attend the shower bond with the mother and enable the new family to say thanks ahead of time, figuring out who is willing and able to help them with the challenges of bringing up.

According to etiquette authority Miss Manners, because the party centers on gift-giving, the baby shower is typically arranged and hosted by a close friend rather than a member of the family, since it is considered improper for families to beg for gifts on behalf of their members. However, this custom varies by culture or region and in some it is expected and customary for a close female family member to host the baby shower, often the baby's maternal grandmother.

When a baby shower is held after a baby's birth, an invitation to attend the shower may be combined with a baby announcement. In the US, if a baby shower does not happen before the arrival of the baby, a sip-and-see party or other similar events can be organized after the birth.

Gifts 
Guests bring small gifts for the expectant mother. Typical gifts related to babies include diapers, blankets, baby bottles, clothes, and toys. It is common to open gifts during the party; sometimes the host will make a game of opening gifts.

Family bonding 
The baby shower is a family's first opportunity to gather people together to help play a part in their child's life. The new parents may wish to call on people to assist in the upbringing of their child, and help educate the child over time. People around the family, who care for them, want to be involved in the child's life, and a baby shower presents an opportunity for them to give gifts and be of help, showing their love for the family. If it happens before the birth, it allows the new family to thank everyone before the stress of a new baby and lack of sleep begins.

History 

The term "baby shower" is relatively new, but the celebrations and rituals associated with pregnancy and childbirth are both ancient and enduring.

Ancient Egypt In ancient Egypt, rituals relating to the birth of a child took place after the event itself. Quite unlike modern baby showers, this involved the mother and the child being separated to "contain and eliminate the pollution of birth" – this may have included visiting local temples or shrines. After this, there may also have been household rituals that took place, but the specifics have been found hard to study as these are such female-centered events.
Ancient India In India, a pregnancy ritual has been followed since the vedic ages: an event called simantha, held in the 7th or 8th month. The mother-to-be is showered with dry fruits, sweets and other gifts that help the baby's growth. A musical event to please the baby's ears is the highlight of the ritual, as it was common knowledge that the baby's ears would start functioning within the womb. The ritual prays for a healthy baby and mother, as well as a happy delivery and motherhood.
Ancient Greece The ancient Greeks also celebrated pregnancy after the birth, with a shout (oloyge) after the labor has ended, to indicate that "peace had arrived". Five to seven days later, there is a ceremony called Amphidromia, to indicate that the baby had integrated into the household. In wealthy families, the public dekate ceremony, after ten days, indicated the mother's return to society. (The ten-day period is still observed in modern-day Iran.)
Medieval Europe Due to the likelihood a mother would die in childbirth, this time was recognized as having a great risk of spiritual danger in addition to the risk of physical danger. Priests would often visit women during labor so they could confess their sins. After the birth, usually on the same day, a baptism ceremony would take place for the baby. In this ceremony, the godparents would give gifts to the child, including a pair of silver spoons.
Renaissance Europe Pregnancies at this time were celebrated with many different kinds of birth gifts: functional items, like wooden trays and bowls, as well as paintings, sculptures, and food. Childbirth was seen as almost mystical, and mothers-to-be were often surrounded with references to the Annunciation by way of encouragement and celebration.
Victorian Britain and North America Superstitions sometimes led to speculation that a woman might be pregnant, such as two teaspoons being accidentally placed together on a saucer. Gifts were usually hand-made, but the grandmother would give silver, such as a spoon, mug, or porringer. In Britain, the manners of the upper-class (and, later, middle-class) required pregnancy to be treated with discretion: the declining of social invitations was often the only hint given. After the birth, a monthly nurse would be engaged, whose duties included regulating visitors. When the nanny took over, the mother began to resume normal domestic life, and the resumption of the weekly 'at home' afternoon tea an opportunity for female friends to visit. The Christening - usually held when the child was between 8-12 weeks old - was an important social event for the family, godparents and friends. 
Modern North America The modern baby shower in America started in the late 1940s and the 1950s, as post-war women were expecting the Baby Boom generation. As in earlier eras, when young women married and were provided with trousseau, the shower served the function of providing the mother and her home with useful material goods.

While continuing the traditions from the 1950s, modern technology has altered the form a baby shower takes: games can include identifying baby parts on a sonogram. Moreover, although traditional baby showers were female-exclusive, mixed-sex showers have increased in frequency.

In different countries

Baby showers and other social events to celebrate an impending or recent birth are popular around the world. They are often women-only social gatherings.

 In Australia, Canada, New Zealand, and the United States, baby showers are a common tradition.
 In Brazil, a party called "chá de bebê" (baby tea) is offered before birth.
 In Bulgaria, as a superstition, no baby gifts are given to the family before the baby's birth. However, family and friends give or send unsolicited gifts to the newborn baby, even if some babies are kept from the public for the first 40 days to prevent early infections. 
 In Chinese tradition a baby shower, manyue (满月), is held one month after the baby is born. 
 In Hmong culture, a baby shower is called "Puv Hli", and is held one month after the baby is born. A ceremony would be hosted by the paternal grandparents or the father to welcome the baby to the family by tying the baby's wrist with white yarn and/or strings. 
 In Armenia, a baby shower is called "qarasunq" (քառասունք) and is celebrated 40 days after the birth. It is a mixed party for all relatives and friends. Guests usually bring gifts for the baby or parents.
 In Iran, a baby shower (Persian:حمام زایمان) is also called a "sismooni party" (Persian:جشن سیسمونی). It is celebrated 1–3 months before the baby's birth. Family and close friends give gifts intended for the baby such as a cot, toys, and baby clothes.
 In Costa Rica, a baby shower party is called té de canastilla ("basket tea"), and multiple events are held for a single pregnancy for the family, co-workers, and friends.
 In Mongolia, a baby shower is called "хүүхдийн угаалга" (huuhdyn ugaalga).
 In Hindu tradition, they are called by different names depending on the family's community.
 In northern India it is known as godbharaai (filled lap), in the Punjab region, it is also known as "reet".In western India, especially Maharashtra, the celebration is known as dohaaljewan, and in Odisha it is called saadhroshi. In West Bengal, in many places a party named "sadh" (সাধ) or "sadhbhokkhon" (সাধভক্ষণ) is observed on the seventh month of pregnancy. After this, the woman resides in her father's house instead of her husband's until the birth. 
 In southern India, in Tamil Nadu and Andhra Pradesh it is called seemantham, valaikaapu or poochoottal. The expecting mother wears bangles and is adorned with flowers.
 In Karnataka it is called seemanta(ಸೀಮಂತ) or kubasa (ಕುಬಸ). It is held when the woman is in her 5th, 7th, or 9th month of pregnancy.
 In coastal Karnataka, especially in Tulunadu (Tulu speaking region), the ceremony is also known as "baayake" ('ಬಾಯಕೆ'). Baayake in Tulu means desire. It is popularly considered that pregnant women crave fruits and eatables during the pregnancy period; and the ceremony was designed in the olden days to fulfill the desire or food cravings of the mother-to-be.
 Although these might be celebrated together, they are very different: seemantham is a religious ceremony, while valaikappu and poochoottal are purely social events much like Western baby showers. In a valaikappu or poochoottal, music is played and the expectant mother is decked in traditional attire with many flowers and garlands made of jasmine or mogra. A swing is decorated with flowers of her choice, which she uses to sit and swing. At times, symbolic cut-outs of moons and stars are put up. The elderly ladies from the household and community shower blessings on the expectant mother and gifts are given to her.
 In Gujarat, it is known as seemant or kholo bharyo, a religious ritual for most Gujarati Hindus during the 5th or 7th month of pregnancy, usually only for the first child. The expectant mother can only go to her father's house for delivery after her seemant. They offer special prayer and food to the goddess "Randal, the wife of the Sun". 
 In Jain tradition, the baby shower ceremony is often called as "Shreemant". The expectant mother can go to her father's house in the 5th month of pregnancy and has to come back before the baby shower ceremony. After the ceremony the expectant mother cannot go back to her father's house. The ceremony is only performed on Sunday, Tuesday or Thursday of the seventh or ninth month of pregnancy. During the ceremony one of the practice is that the younger brother-in-law of the expectant mother dips his hands in Kumkuma water and slaps the expectant mother seven times on her cheeks and then the expectant mother slaps her younger brother-in-law seven times on his cheeks.
 In Kerala it is known as pulikudi or vayattu pongala''', and is practiced predominantly in the Nair community, though its popularity has spread to other Hindu sects over the years. On an auspicious day, after being massaged with homemade ayurvedic oil the woman has a customary bath with the help of the elderly women in the family. After this, the family deity is worshipped, invoking all the paradevatas (family deities) and a concoction of herbal medicines prepared traditionally, is given to the woman. She is dressed in new clothes and jewellery used for such occasions. A big difference in the western concept of baby shower and Hindu tradition is that the Hindu ceremony is a religious ceremony to pray for the baby's well-being. In most conservative families, gifts are bought for the mother-to-be but not the baby. The baby is showered with gifts only after birth.
 In the Islamic tradition of Aqiqah, an animal (such as a sheep) is slaughtered anytime after the birth, and the meat is distributed among relatives and the poor. The practice is considered sunnah and is not done universally.'Raise your voices and kill your animals' : Islamic discourses on the Idd el-Hajj and sacrifices in Tanga (Tanzania) : authoritative texts, ritual practices and social identities / by Gerard C. van de Bruinhorst full text
 In South Africa, a baby shower is called a stork party (named after the folk myth that a white stork delivers babies), and typically takes place during the mother's 6th month. Stork parties, usually not attended by men and often organized as a surprise for the mother, involve silliness such as dressing up, and mothers receive gifts of baby supplies.
 In Nepal a baby shower is known as "dahi chiura khuwaune". The mother-to-be is given gifts from her elders and a meal is cooked for her according to her preferences. The pregnant mother is often invited by her relatives to eat meals with them. Pasni is a traditional celebration that often marks a baby boy's 6th month or a baby girl's fifth month, marking the transition to a diet higher in carbohydrates and allowing guests to bestow blessings, and money and other gifts. 
 In Guatemala, only women attend this event. Middle-class women usually celebrate more than one baby shower (one with close friends, co-workers, family, etc.).
 In Russia, and Commonwealth of Independent States, there are no baby showers, though some of the younger generation are starting to adopt the custom.
 In Egypt a baby shower is known as " Sebouh " (سبوع) (sebouh means week) which is usually celebrated one week after birth hence its name. This is usually celebrated with a DJ, much decoration, a food and candy buffet, activities and games.
 In Puerto Rico, a baby shower is celebrated anytime after other family members are made aware of the pregnancy, but typically during the last trimester. The grandmother, sisters, or friends of the pregnant mother organize the celebration and invite other relatives and friends. It is not common for men to attend baby showers. The "bendición" (blessing) is bestowed money and other gifts.
 In Vietnam, as a superstition no baby shower should be planned before the baby arrives.  The baby shower is only organized when it is one month old.  The baby shower is known as “ Đầy tháng” which means “ one full month” .  The party is usually organized  by the baby’s parents and/or the grandparents (baby’s father’s side).  Relatives and close friends are invited.  Gifts are welcomed, but try to avoid white color material gifts such as white clothing, white towels, white cloths …(mourning color)

Baby showers for fathers
Some baby showers are directed at fathers. These may be more oriented towards drinking beer, watching sports, fishing, or playing video games. The primary nature of these gifts is diapers and/or diaper-related items. The organization of the diaper party is typically done by the friends of the father-to-be as a way of helping to prepare for the coming child.  These parties may be held at local pubs/bars, a friend's house, or the soon-to-be grandfather's house. In the United Kingdom, this is called wetting the baby's head, and is generally more common than baby showers. However, with the growth of American cultural influence- accelerated through celebrities via social media sites like Instagram, baby shower decorations are becoming more common in the United Kingdom. Wetting the baby's head is traditionally when the father celebrates the birth by having a few drinks and getting drunk with a group of friends.

There has been some controversy over these, with Judith Martin calling them a "monstrous imposition", although she was referring to the attitude of demanding gifts and not necessarily the male version of a baby shower.

In Hungary, such an event is called Milking party held by tradition in favor of the mother to be blessed with breast milk for the newborn. Practically it is the last day-off of the father for some time as he is expected to stay home to help. No similar domestic custom exists for mothers, such as a baby shower. Gifts for the baby are given on the first visit to his/her home. This, due to health concerns, happens at the appropriate and suitable time for each counterpart.

Names for eventsDiaper shower refers to a small-scale baby shower, generally for subsequent children, when the parents don't need as many baby supplies.Grandma's shower refers to a shower at which people bring items for the grandparents to keep at their house, such as a collapsible crib and a changing pad.Sprinkles are small showers for a subsequent child, especially a child who is of a different gender than the previous offspring.
A sip and see party'' is a celebration usually planned by the new parents, so that friends and family can sip on refreshments and meet the new baby.

See also
Gender reveal party
Maternity package (or baby box), another way for parents to acquire the necessities for their first child
Postpartum confinement, a set of customs for mother and baby immediately following the birth
Simantonnayana, a Hindu ritual similar to a baby shower

References

Hindu girl names from namesstarting.com

External links

Ceremonies
Human pregnancy
Infancy